Lee Zahner (born 13 March 1974 in Brisbane, Queensland) is a male beach volleyball player who represented Australia many times in including the 2000 Summer Olympics where he and teammate Julien Prosser ended up in 9th place.

Zahner is also a licensed commercial and private pilot, and works in the investment property and real estate sector.

References
 Profile at the Beach Volleyball Database

1974 births
Living people
Australian men's beach volleyball players
Olympic beach volleyball players of Australia
Beach volleyball players at the 1996 Summer Olympics
Beach volleyball players at the 2000 Summer Olympics
Sportspeople from Brisbane